John Bischoff may refer to:
John W. Bischoff (1850–1909), blind American musician
John Bischoff (baseball) (1894–1981), American baseball player
John Bischoff (musician) (born 1949), American musician, pioneer in live computer music
John Bischoff (singer), singer with Chanticleer (ensemble)

See also
Bischoff